Teleiodes albidorsella is a moth of the family Gelechiidae. It is found in Spain and Portugal.

References

Moths described in 1999
Teleiodes
Moths of Europe